Tuři Svitavy is a professional basketball team that plays in the top professional Czech basketball league, the NBL. The team is based in the town of Svitavy.

History
The first basketball team in Svitavy was established in 1951, under the name TJ Svitavy.  A professional team was established in 2001 under the name Basketball Svitavy. Since the 2010–2011 season, Tuři Svitavy have competed in the Czech top-level National Basketball League.

European record

Notes

Players

Current roster

2015/2016 roster

References

External links
Official website
Eurobasket.com Turi Svitavy Page

Basketball teams in the Czech Republic
Basketball teams established in 2001